Internet Security Alliance (ISAlliance) was founded in 2001 as a non-profit collaboration between the Electronic Industries Alliance (EIA), a federation of trade associations, and Carnegie Mellon University's CyLab, focussing on cyber security. The ISAlliance is a forum for information sharing and leadership on information security, and it lobbies for corporate security interests.

Objectives 
 Work with legislative and regulatory bodies to ensure that market incentives are at the forefront of policy
 Promote greater corporate responsibility on information security issues
 Facilitate executive-to-executive communications about solutions to threats and emerging trends
 Conducts research leading to identification and resolution of root causes to information security problems
 Develop training programs across the gamut of corporate information security issues
 Provide a coordination point for industry dialogue on self-regulation issues such as market incentives, IT risk management and privacy
 Develop organizationally viable models for integration and adoption of security best practices
 Educate senior management and boards, linking information security throughout the enterprise operations
 Conduct timely seminars on emerging security issues
 Provide early warning of emerging security threats and in-depth reports on vulnerabilities and threats

The ISAlliance has proposed a "Cybersecurity Social Contract" that offers an "action plan" to protect the United States from cyber attacks.

International operations
While the ISAlliance is physically based in the United States, its membership operates internationally and the goal is international security for all its trusted partners. The ISAlliance has member companies on four continents. There has always been a non-U.S. based company on the Executive Committee. The ISAlliance believes the international communication it fosters is critical to the long-term success of achieving greater information security. Moreover, international representation and voice more realistically addresses the many difficult problems which face all users of the Internet.

Publications
Published in 2009, The Financial Impact of Cyber Risk is the first known guidance document to approach the financial impact of cyber risks from the perspective of core business functions.  It provides guidance to CFOs and their colleagues responsible for legal issues, business operations and technology, privacy and compliance, risk assessment and insurance, and corporate communications.

References

External links 
 
 

Non-profit organizations based in Arlington, Virginia
Standards organizations in the United States
Technology trade associations
Companies established in 2001
Computer networks